Ana Odaliza Díaz Rodríguez (born 27 July 1985), sometimes known as Odaliza Díaz, is a Dominican footballer who plays as a defender. She has been a member of the Dominican Republic women's national team.

International career
Díaz capped for the Dominican Republic at senior level during the 2010 CONCACAF Women's World Cup Qualifying qualification, the 2012 CONCACAF Women's Olympic Qualifying Tournament and the 2014 Central American and Caribbean Games.

References 

1985 births
Living people
Dominican Republic women's footballers
Women's association football defenders
Dominican Republic women's international footballers
Competitors at the 2014 Central American and Caribbean Games